A bergschrund (from the German for mountain cleft) or rimaye (from French) is a crevasse that forms where moving glacier ice separates from the stagnant ice or firn above. It is often a serious obstacle for mountaineers, who sometimes abbreviate "bergschrund" to "schrund".

The bergschrund is distinct from the randkluft (also called rimaye), which is the crevasse of which one face is the rock, back wall of the corrie. The randkluft arises in part from the melting of the ice due to the presence of the warmer rock face. However, the randkluft is sometimes called a bergschrund. The French word rimaye covers both notions of randkluft and bergschrund. In a corrie or cirque, the bergschrund is positioned at the rear, parallel to the back wall of the corrie. It is caused by the rotational movement of the glacier. In a longitudinal glacier, the bergschrund is at the top end of the glacier at a right angle to the flow of the glacier. It is caused by the downwards flow of the glacier.

In winter, a bergschrund is often filled by snow from avalanches from the mountain above it. In later summer, due to melting, it lies open and can present a very difficult obstacle to alpinists.

On the South Col route to reach the summit of Mount Everest, a deep bergschrund lies at the bottom of the Lhotse face, separating Camp II from Camp III.

References

External links 

 

Glaciology
Geological hazards
Mountaineering